Parliamentary elections were held in Hungary between 1 July and 18 August 1875. The result was a victory for the Liberal Party, which won 333 of the 414 seats.

Results

Hungary
Election
Elections in Hungary
Elections in Austria-Hungary

hu:Magyarországi országgyűlési választások a dualizmus korában#1875